Abiquo Hybrid Cloud Management Platform is a web-based cloud computing software platform developed by
Abiquo. Written entirely in Java, it is used to build, integrate and manage public and private clouds in homogeneous environments. Users can deploy and manage servers, storage system and network and virtual devices. It also supports LDAP integration.

Hypervisors 
Abiquo supports five hypervisor systems.

 VMware ESXi
 Microsoft Hyper-V
 Citrix XenServer
 Oracle VM Server for x86
 KVM

From version 3.1, it also supports multiple public cloud providers:

 Amazon AWS 
 Rackspace
 Google Compute Engine
 HP Cloud
 ElasticHosts
 DigitalOcean

Abiquo version 3.2 added:

 Microsoft Azure

Abiquo version 3.4 added:

 Support for Docker hosts, adding multi-tenant networking, storage management and private registry management for Docker
 SoftLayer
 CloudSigma

Later versions continued to add features including autoscaling on any cloud, integration to VMware NSX and OpenStack Neutron for software defined networking, guest config with cloud-init and integrated monitoring driving guest automation.

Storage services 
Abiquo supports any vendor for hypervisor storage, and also supports tiered storage pools, enabling storage-as-a-service from specific vendors and technologies including:
NFS
Generic iSCSI
NetApp
Nexenta

SAAS version 
In April 2014 Abiquo launched Abiquo anyCloud, a SAAS version of the Abiquo Hybrid Cloud Platform software. This version lets users manage public cloud resources from:

Amazon AWS
Microsoft Azure
IBM SoftLayer
DigitalOcean
Rackspace Open Cloud (an OpenStack cloud)
HP Public Cloud (an OpenStack cloud)
Google Compute Engine
ElasticHosts

Additional security and process features include workflow, to have an enterprise administrator electronically sign off on changes, an audit trail of activity and the ability to share cloud accounts among and enterprise team in a secure way.

Reviews and awards 
Finalist for the 2015 Cloud Awards
Finalist for the 2015 UK Cloud Awards in the category Cloud Management Product of the Year
EMA Radar for Private Cloud platforms 2013
Global Telecoms Business Innovation Summit and Awards 2013 (with Interoute)
EuroCloud UK Awards

References 

Cloud infrastructure
Cloud computing